Norberto Díaz (March 1, 1952 Buenos Aires - December 18, 2010), who was called Gallego by others in the entertainment industry, was an Argentine actor who played the villain in famous soap operas in his country, Argentina.

Diaz's film credits included The Lighthouse, Buenos Aires Plateada, No habrá más penas ni olvido, Mirtha, De Liniers a Estambul and Darse Cuenta. His soup operas credits included Son Amores, Celeste siempre Celeste, Yago, Collar de Esmeraldas, Perla Negra. Díaz was also a stage actor, he made his debut in Hedy Crilla's play Solo 80. During 2010 he played the role of Abraham in El Conventillo de la Paloma, Vaccarezza's play at Teatro Nacional Cervantes
Norberto Díaz died in his sleep at his home on December 18, 2010, at the age of 58. He had recently suffered from stomach ailments.

References

External links

1952 births
2010 deaths
20th-century Argentine male actors
Argentine male television actors
Argentine male telenovela actors
Argentine male film actors
Burials at La Chacarita Cemetery